El Corazón may refer to:

El Corazón, Cotopaxi
El Corazón (Don Cherry and Ed Blackwell album), 1982
El Corazón (Steve Earle album), 1997